Dungeon Hill is an Iron Age hillfort, about  north of the village of Buckland Newton in Dorset, England. It is a scheduled monument.

Description
It has an external ditch of width  and depth . There are traces af an outer bank on the east side.

On the east facing slope of the hill there are four lynchets, suggesting cultivation in the medieval period.

Remains found
In the late 18th century Fitzwalter Foy, resident of nearby Duntish Court, who was the owner of the fort, cleared the site of woodland, and he recovered human bones, sword blades, Roman coins and other finds. In 1881 there was some excavation of the site: Roman pottery, fragments of Roman querns and building stone were found; Roman tiles were found in the interior.

See also
 Hillforts in Britain

References

Hill forts in Dorset
Scheduled monuments in Dorset